Horse Museum may refer to:

Living Museum of the Horse, France
Fort Garry Horse Museum & Archives, 
Westphalian Horse Museum, Germany
Horse Museum (Dr. Seuss), children's book

See also
:Category:Equestrian museums